The United States District Court for the Southern District of Ohio (in case citations, S.D. Ohio) is one of two United States district courts in Ohio and includes forty-eight of the state's eighty-eight counties–everything from the Columbus area southward.  Appeals from the court are taken to the United States Court of Appeals for the Sixth Circuit at Cincinnati (except for patent claims and claims against the U.S. government under the Tucker Act, which are appealed to the Federal Circuit).

The United States Attorney's Office of the Southern District of Ohio represents the United States in civil and criminal litigation in the court. , the United States Attorney is Kenneth L. Parker.

Divisions
The court is divided into two divisions.

Eastern Division
The Eastern Division, which sits in the Joseph P. Kinneary United States Courthouse at Columbus, serves the counties of Athens, Belmont, Coshocton, Delaware, Fairfield, Fayette, Franklin, Gallia, Guernsey, Harrison, Hocking, Jackson, Jefferson, Knox, Licking, Logan, Madison, Meigs, Monroe, Morgan, Morrow, Muskingum, Noble, Perry, Pickaway, Pike, Ross, Union, Vinton, and Washington.

Western Division
The Western Division sits at both Cincinnati and Dayton.  Cases from the counties of Adams, Brown, Butler, Clermont, Clinton, Hamilton, Highland, Lawrence, Scioto, and Warren are heard at Cincinnati in the Potter Stewart United States Courthouse.  Cases from the counties of Champaign, Clark, Darke, Greene, Miami, Montgomery, Preble, and Shelby are heard at Dayton.

History 
The act of authorized one judgeship for the court. The district court in Ohio, not being assigned to a judicial circuit, was granted the same jurisdiction as U.S. circuit courts, except in appeals and writs of error, which were the jurisdiction of the Supreme Court. By the act of February 24, 1807, the authority of the Ohio district court to exercise the jurisdiction of a U.S. circuit court was repealed, and Ohio was assigned to the newly organized Seventh Circuit. It also provided for a U.S. circuit court for the District of Ohio. 
The district judge serving the District of Ohio, Humphrey H. Leavitt, was reassigned to the Southern District of Ohio.

Additional judgeships were created in 1910, 1937, 1966, 1970, 1978, 1984, and 1990.

Current judges 
:

Former judges

Chief judges

Succession of seats

United States Attorneys

See also 
 Courts of Ohio
 List of current United States district judges
 List of United States federal courthouses in Ohio
 United States District Court for the Northern District of Ohio
 United States federal judicial district

Notes

External links 
 The court's official site
 U.S. Attorney's site, with map of district

Ohio, Southern District
Ohio law
Columbus, Ohio
Cincinnati
Dayton, Ohio
Courthouses in Ohio
1855 establishments in Ohio
Courts and tribunals established in 1855